Església de Sant Martí de la Cortinada  is a church located in La Cortinada, Andorra. It is a heritage property registered in the Cultural Heritage of Andorra. It was built originally in the 11th-12th century and rebuilt in the 17th century.

References

Ordino
Roman Catholic churches in Andorra
Cultural Heritage of Andorra